Go Soo-jung (April 17, 1995 – February 7, 2020) was a South Korean actress and model. She was best known for starring in Goblin and Solomon's Perjury. She also appeared in a music video for BTS's song "With Seoul".

Biography
Go Soo-jung was born on April 17, 1995. She started her acting career in 2016 and she also did modeling. She did supporting in dramas such as Goblin and Solomon's Perjury.

IIlness and death
She died on February 7, 2020. Her agency Story J Company stated that she died due to chronic illness. Her parents held the funeral privately.

Filmography

Television

Film

Music Videos

References

External links 
 
 

1995 births
2020 deaths
21st-century South Korean actresses
South Korean female models
South Korean television actresses
South Korean film actresses